Samar Jai Singh (born 26 September 1966) is an Indian film actor and acting trainer. He graduated from Government Law College, but started in Indian film and television industry in 1992. Samar is an acting coach as one of the founders and directors of Kreating Charakters acting school, since 2005, in Mumbai. He became famous as Lord Shiva in the TV series Om Namah Shivay, in 1997.

Career

As an actor, he has worked in wide range of films from Film and Television Institute of India – FTII, in Pune, to National Film Development Corporation Limited - NFDC, in Mumbai. On television, he has worked as lead player on several entertainment channels.

Filmography

Television

 Samrat Ashok (1992) as Emperor Ashok, directed by Prakash Mehata.
 Om Namah Shivay (1997) as Lord Shiva,  directed by Dheeraj Kumar. 
 Ek Aur Mahabharat (1997) as Karna directed by Chandraprakash Dwivedi.
 Vishnu Puran (2000) as Lord Shiva, directed by Ravi Chopra.
 Kahani Ghar Ghar Ki as Harpreet Gill
 Ramayan (2002) as Indrajit, directed by B. R. Chopra.
 Saara Akaash
 Sher-e-Punjab: Maharaja Ranjit Singh (2017)  as Sahib Singh Bedi

Film
Vishwatma as Brother of Madan Bhardwaj
 Little War (1994) FTII directed by Atanu Biswas.  
 Sundari (1997) NFDC directed by Gul Bahar Singh.  
 Gadar: Ek Prem Katha (2001) as Salim  
 Pinjar: Beyond Boundaries... (2003) 
 Ab Tumhare Hawale Watan Saathiyo (2004) 
 Apne (2007)    
 Ek Tha Tiger (2012) as Rabinder   
 Heropanti (2014) as Bhupi 
 Haseena Parkar (2017) as inspector Ranbir Likha, directed by Apoorva Lakhiya.
 Friends In Law  (2018) Directed by Amit Khanna
 Samrat Prithviraj (2022) as Mahamantri Kaimas, Directed by Chandraprakash Dwivedi, Produced by Yash Raj Films

Sources 
 The God Factory 
 Heropanti - Bollywood Movie - Personal Reviews 
 Bollywood calling for Bahraini journalist 
 Kreating Charakters Veteran actor and trainer Samar Jai Singh in action 
 Veteran actor Samar Jai Singh stills

References

External links

1966 births
Living people
Indian male film actors
Indian male television actors
Male actors from Indore